"Maude's Dilemma" is a two-part episode in season one of the television show Maude, airing in 1972. It is considered a groundbreaking show due to bringing the controversial issue of abortion into people's living rooms and forcing families to confront this open secret.

Plot 
Maude discovers that she is pregnant at the age of 47, and struggles to decide whether to have the baby or have an abortion. Her daughter, Carol, encourages an end to the pregnancy; her husband, Walter, insists he will support any choice Maude makes, promising he will have a vasectomy, which he is actually reluctant to do.

Development 
Producer Rod Parker explained: "The funny thing is that initially we weren`t even thinking abortion ... The group Zero Population Growth announced they were giving a $10,000 prize for comedies that had something to do with controlling population, so everyone came in with ideas for vasectomies".

Producer Norman Lear decided against a false pregnancy due to it being a cop out; he also decided against having Maude suffer a miscarriage, because that situation had already been done on his other show, All in the Family, to character Gloria Bunker. He decided that given her age, Maude would have realistically had an abortion despite her moral turmoil regarding the subject.

The network was okay with the subject matter due to the success of the show, though asked for the show to present an opposing view; the writers obliged by adding a character who had many children and who was content with their choice.

Critical reception 
The Chicago Tribune described this episode as a watershed moment that "brought the battle over choice into the prime-time arena".

Controversy 
According to a 1992 Chicago Tribune article

A 1972 New York Times article noted that two Illinois CBS affiliates, WCIA in Champaign and WMBD-TV in Peoria, refused to air the two-part episode marking the first time any CBS station had refused to run an episode of a continuing series.  However, an August 14, 1973, New York Times article published the same day the episode's first summer rerun premiered stated that only 25 CBS affiliates had refused to air the repeat showing.

References

External links
 
 

1972 American television episodes
Television episodes about abortion